The Baybridge Canal was a short canal built entirely within the parish of West Grinstead in the English county of Sussex. It opened in 1826, and closed in 1875.

History
The River Adur is formed when the Western Adur and the Eastern Adur join near Henfield. The Western branch starts near Slinfold, and flows through Shipley and West Grinstead. The Eastern branch rises on Ditchling Common, and flows through Haywards Heath and Burgess Hill. Under an act of Parliament obtained in 1807, the river was improved, to aid both navigation and drainage, and barges could reach Bines Bridge on the Western Adur.

In 1824, the civil engineer May Upton produced a plan for extending the navigation northwards to West Grinstead, at a cost of just under £6,000. This formed the basis for another act of Parliament, which was obtained in 1825, and created the Baybridge Canal Company. Seven men were named as proprietors, including Lord Selsey and Sir Charles Merrick Burrell, and they were empowered to raise £6,000 by issuing shares, and an additional £3,000 by mortgages if required. Although called a canal, it was essentially a river navigation, as it followed the course of the river to West Grinstead, to terminate at a wharf near the Worthing to Horsham turnpike road, now the A24.

All of the route was within the parish of West Grinstead, and the construction work was completed in 1826. The main trade was manure, coal and chalk. The canal closed on 1 September 1875 due to competition from the railways, having been little used after the opening of the railway from Shoreham to West Grinstead in 1861.

Course
The waterway was crossed by a swing bridge just above the lower lock, and a lift bridge at Hatterell Farm. Both have been replaced by fixed bridges, and the Environment Agency maintain a gauging station at the Hatterell Farm bridge, which measures flows in the river. The average flow up to 2005 was 22.43 million gallons (101.9 Megalitres) per day.

Points of interest

Bibliography

References

See also

Canals of Great Britain
History of the British canal system

Canals in West Sussex
Transport in West Sussex
History of West Sussex
1826 establishments in England
Canals opened in 1826